The 2000–01 NBA season was the 33rd season for the Phoenix Suns, members of the Pacific Division in the National Basketball Association. During the off-season, the Suns signed free agents Mario Elie, and Tony Delk, and acquired Chris Dudley from the New York Knicks. The Suns were coached by Scott Skiles, who enjoyed his first full season as head coach as the Suns posted a 7-game winning streak after losing their season opener, and held a 28–20 record at the All-Star break. The team posted another 7-game winning streak between March and April, as they finished the regular season with a 51–31 record. For a franchise-record 13th season in a row, the Suns earned a trip to the playoffs, but would later lose in the Western Conference First Round. America West Arena was the home court venue for the Suns.

The Suns were led by point guard Jason Kidd, who averaged 16.9 points, 6.4 rebounds, 9.8 assists and 2.2 steals per game. Kidd again led the league in assists per game, while earning another All-NBA First Team selection and NBA All-Defensive First Team (after being selected to the Second Team the year previous). He was also the team's lone representative in the 2001 NBA All-Star Game. In addition, second-year star Shawn Marion showed improvement as he averaged a double-double, with 17.3 points, 10.7 rebounds, 1.7 steals and 1.4 blocks per game. Kidd and Clifford Robinson were the other starters to provide the majority of the team's scoring, with Robinson averaging 16.4 points per game. Sixth men reserves Delk and Rodney Rogers both brought offensive firepower from the bench, averaging 12.3 and 12.2 points per game respectively. Penny Hardaway was the team's highest-paid player, but only played in just four games due to a knee injury, averaging 9.8 points and 1.5 steals per game.

For the fourth season in a row, the Suns finished third in the Pacific Division. The team earned a Western Conference First Round match-up with the 3rd-seeded Sacramento Kings. Phoenix would take Game 1, a 86–83 road win in Sacramento, but would then lose the next three games in a row, losing the series three games to one. Following the season, Kidd was traded to the New Jersey Nets, while Robinson was dealt to the Detroit Pistons, Dudley re-signed as a free agent with his former team, the Portland Trail Blazers, and Elie retired.

For the season, the Suns redesigned their primary logo, and changed their uniforms adding side panels to their jerseys and shorts, and grey to their color scheme. The logo and uniforms both remained in use until 2013.

Offseason

NBA Draft

Roster

Regular season

Standings

Record vs. opponents

Playoffs

|- align="center" bgcolor="#ccffcc"
| 1
| April 22
| @ Sacramento
| W 86–83
| Shawn Marion (21)
| Jake Tsakalidis (11)
| Jason Kidd (14)
| ARCO Arena17,317
| 1–0
|- align="center" bgcolor="#ffcccc"
| 2
| April 25
| @ Sacramento
| L 90–116
| Tony Delk (14)
| Tom Gugliotta (8)
| Jason Kidd (9)
| ARCO Arena17,317
| 1–1
|- align="center" bgcolor="#ffcccc"
| 3
| April 29
| Sacramento
| L 96–104
| Jason Kidd (19)
| Shawn Marion (10)
| Jason Kidd (16)
| America West Arena19,023
| 1–2
|- align="center" bgcolor="#ffcccc"
| 4
| May 2
| Sacramento
| L 82–89
| Clifford Robinson (24)
| Jake Tsakalidis (12)
| Jason Kidd (14)
| America West Arena18,836
| 1–3
|-

Awards and honors

All-Star
 Jason Kidd was voted as a starter for the Western Conference in the All-Star Game. It was his fourth All-Star selection. Kidd finished second in voting among Western Conference guards with 1,062,837 votes.

Season
 Jason Kidd was named to the All-NBA First Team. Kidd also finished eighth in MVP voting.
 Jason Kidd was named to the NBA All-Defensive First Team. Kidd also finished 11th in Defensive Player of the Year voting.
 Jason Kidd led the league in assists per game, with a 9.8 average, and total assists with 753.
 Shawn Marion finished 11th in Defensive Player of the Year voting, and fourth in Most Improved Player voting.
 Rodney Rogers finished sixth in Sixth Man of the Year voting. Rogers won the award the previous year in 2000.
 Tony Delk finished tenth in Sixth Man of the Year voting.

Player statistics

Season

* – Stats with the Suns.
† – Minimum 300 field goals made.
^ – Minimum 125 free throws made.

Playoffs

Transactions

Trades

Free agents

Additions

Subtractions

Player Transactions Citation:

References

External links
 Standings on Basketball Reference

Phoenix Suns seasons